The Neman is a European river that rises in Belarus and flows through Lithuania.

Neman may also refer to:
Neman culture
FC Neman Grodno, a soccer club in Belarus
FC Neman Mosty, a soccer club in Belarus
HK Neman Grodno, an ice hockey club in Belarus
Neman Stadium, a stadium in Belarus
Neman R-10, a Soviet aircraft of the 1930s
Neman (bus), bus manufacturer in Belarus
 Neman (album)

Places
Neman, Russia, a town in Kaliningrad Oblast, Russia

See also
Nieman (surname)
Niemen (disambiguation)